Li Haicong (born 2 February 1971) is a Chinese sport shooter who competed in the 1996 Summer Olympics.

References

1971 births
Living people
Chinese male sport shooters
ISSF rifle shooters
Olympic shooters of China
Shooters at the 1996 Summer Olympics
Place of birth missing (living people)